The Legend of Tom Dooley is a 1959 American Western film directed by Ted Post and starring Michael Landon, Jo Morrow, Jack Hogan, Richard Rust, Dee Pollock and Ken Lynch. It was based on the 90-year-old folk song "Tom Dooley", which had been inspired by the real-life case of convicted murderer Tom Dula. The ballad, as sung by the Kingston Trio, was a big hit in 1958 and is the theme song of the film. The movie's plot is consistent with the lyrics of the song, but otherwise bears little resemblance to the actual murder case.

Plot
At the end of the American Civil War, Confederate soldier Tom Dooley (Landon) leads an attack on a stagecoach, unaware that the war was already over. Dooley is declared to be a murderer, but he returns to his hometown, hoping to marry his fiancée, Laura Foster (Morrow).

Trouble soon breaks out, and  Laura and he are forced to elope, pursued by lawman Charlie Grayson (Hogan), who also has romantic interest in Laura. Tom and Laura get married and attempt to escape to Tennessee, but are soon captured by Grayson. Dooley is locked up in the town jail after a quick trial, in which he is sentenced to be hanged in the morning, but escapes with the help of one of his Confederate Army friends, "Country Boy".

Grayson catches Laura as she tries to reunite with Dooley. Grayson tries to force himself on Laura, but is interrupted by the arrival of Dooley and Country Boy. In the ensuing fight, Laura is accidentally stabbed while Dooley and Grayson struggle with a knife, and then Grayson and Country Boy shoot each other. Laura dies in Dooley's arms as the sheriff arrives and recaptures Dooley, who is then led off to his execution.

Cast
 Michael Landon as Tom Dooley
 Jo Morrow as Laura Foster
 Jack Hogan as Charlie Grayson
 Richard Rust as Country Boy 
 Dee Pollock as Abel
 Ken Lynch as Father
 Howard Wright as Sheriff Joe Dobbs
 Ralph Moody as Doc Henry
 John Cliff as Lieutenant
 Cheerio Meredith as Meg
 Gary Hunley as The Kid
 Anthony Jochim as Preacher
 Jeff Morris as Confederate Soldier

See also
 List of American films of 1959

References

External links
 
 
 
 

1959 films
1959 Western (genre) films
American Civil War films
Films based on songs
Columbia Pictures films
Films directed by Ted Post
Films scored by Ronald Stein
1950s English-language films
1950s American films